Creston Township is one of eighteen townships in Platte County, Nebraska, United States. The population was 371 at the 2020 census. A 2021 estimate placed the township's population at 365.

The Village of Creston lies within the Township.

Creston Township was established in the 1870s.

See also
County government in Nebraska

References

External links
City-Data.com

Townships in Platte County, Nebraska
Townships in Nebraska